Drepanoglossa is a genus of bristle flies in the family Tachinidae. There are at least three described species in Drepanoglossa.

Species
These three species belong to the genus Drepanoglossa.
 Drepanoglossa amydriae Townsend, 1908
 Drepanoglossa lucens Townsend, 1891
 Drepanoglossa tenuirostris (Reinhard, 1939)

References

Further reading

External links

 

Tachininae